Shaw College is the fourth constituent college to be established at the Chinese University of Hong Kong. It is located in the northwest area of the CUHK campus, facing Tolo Harbour.

History
The college is named after its patron, Sir Run Run Shaw, who donated five hundred million Hong Kong dollars toward its establishment in May 1985. In the same year, the university established a task force to prepare for its establishment. The foundation of the college was enabled by the Chinese University of Hong Kong (Declaration of Shaw College) Ordinance passed by the Legislative Council in July 1986.

The foundation stone was laid on 12 January 1987 in a ceremony officiated by Run Run Shaw and Acting Governor David Akers-Jones. This is considered the school anniversary, and is celebrated each year through student events. The college was officially opened in March 1990 by Run Run Shaw and Governor David Wilson, Baron Wilson of Tillyorn.

Facilities and activities
The college has two student residences: Kuo Mou Hall and Student Hostel II. Kou Mou Hall, called Student Hostel I until it was renamed in 1998, was opened in September 1990 and comprises a ten storey high block and a three-storey low block. It provides 576 dorm spaces for both males and females. Student Hostel II opened in 1992 and was subsequently expanded. It now provides 635 living places in two blocks. The high block was named Yat Sen Hall in 2010.

The college also hosts a guesthouse and one administration building including computer labs, conference rooms and a self-learning centre. Other amenities include a student canteen and an indoor sport facility (including a fitness room, squash courts and an indoor basketball facility). The school is also equipped with a standard outdoor basketball court as well as a barbecue area.

The college provides a wide variety of extra-curricular activities for every student to explore. In addition, tremendous financial aids are offered each year to students with outstanding performances in either academic, social voluntary activities, or sports events. The motto, 修德講學 (Jyutping: sau1 dak1 gong2 hok6), is derived from a work of Confucius.

Alumni

 Gary Chan, member of the Legislative Council
 Florence Hui, undersecretary for Home Affairs
 Daniel Lee, triathlete

References

External links

Official College Facebook Page: Shaw College CUHK 逸夫書院

Chinese University of Hong Kong